Athletes from the Netherlands competed at the 1908 Summer Olympics in London, United Kingdom.

Medalists

Results by event

Athletics

Cycling

Fencing

Football

The Netherlands was represented by the Netherlands national football team.

Gymnastics

Rowing

Shooting

Swimming

Tennis

Water polo

Wrestling

Sources

 
 
 

Nations at the 1908 Summer Olympics
1908
Olympics